was a Japanese actor. He appeared in more than seventy films from 1959 to 2004 and performed in several editions of the film series Otoko wa Tsurai yo.

He graduated from Hosei University. He made his debut in movies with the film Otome no inori directed by Shin Saburi in 1959.

Filmography

Films

Television

Honours 
Order of the Sacred Treasure, 4th Class, Gold Rays with Rosette (1990)

References

External links 

1914 births
2005 deaths
Japanese male film actors